Miervaldis Drāznieks was a Latvian footballer, one of the all-time best goalscorers in the Latvian league.

Almost for the entire his career Drāznieks played in Liepāja scoring 160 goals in the Latvian league. In his first match in the Latvian league in 1947 Drāznieks scored four goals. With Liepājas Metalurgs he won the Latvian league 8 times, the Latvian Cup – 5 times. In 1955 Drāznieks played with Daugava Rīga in the 1st Soviet league and scored 4 goals.

Together with Ernests Ziņģis Drāznieks was one of the best forwards in the post-war Liepāja. Still with all his 160 goals Drāznieks was known as a waster of good scoring opportunities – he had a great ability to be in the right place to score goals but lacked speed and very often missed superb scoring chances. Drāznieks retired from football in 1960.

References

Latvian footballers
Daugava Rīga players
Possibly living people
Year of birth missing
Association footballers not categorized by position